Kayla  Watson  is an American country singer and songwriter from Trinity, NC. Kayla's Great Grandfather is Charlie Bowman (Charlie Bowman and the Blue Ridge Ramblers) who performed alongside of Minnie Pearl and others at the Grand Ole Opry in Nashville, TN.  Kayla started singing as a young child, performing with the Greensboro Youth Chorus at age 6. She has participated in several local competitions and in 2012 made it to the top 30 finalists in the second season of the “X Factor USA”. In 2013, she partnered with local lyricist Jeremy Autry, co-founding the group Crossing Avery and releasing first full album "Way We Live". Recently, Kayla Watson won out of three states the Share a Coke and Song Superstar Tour competition and performed the National Anthem for NASCAR's NC Education Lottery 200 race.

Awards
2010 First place winner of the NATS Singing Competition
2013 Contestant/Top30 of X-Factor USA
2016 Share a Coke and Song Superstar Tour

References

1991 births
Living people
American women country singers
American country songwriters
People from Trinity, North Carolina
21st-century American singers
21st-century American women singers
Country musicians from North Carolina
The X Factor (American TV series) contestants